John Magale Shibuda (born 23 February 1950) is a Tanzanian Chadema politician and Member of Parliament for Maswa West constituency since 2005.

References

1950 births
Living people
Chadema MPs
Tanzanian MPs 2010–2015
Moshi Technical Secondary School alumni